Sikkim Rajya Manch Party (SRMP) (English Translation: Sikkim State Forum Party) is a regional political party in the Indian state of Sikkim. Founder and Incumbent President is Rup Narayan Chamling (R. N. Chamling) who is a little brother of former Chief Minister of Sikkim and the president of Sikkim Democratic Front (SDF), Pawan Kumar Chamling.

History
In spite of the objection of Pawan Kumar Chamling, R.N. Chamling stood as an independent candidate in the bye-election of Sikkim Legislative Assembly on 16 September 2014. R. N. Chamling won and beat the candidate of SDF, Kumari Manger in Yangang. Pawan Kumar Chamling didn't forgive R. N. Chamling's behavior, and didn't accept him as a Member of SDF. As the result, R. N. Chamling  kept his position as an independent Member of Legislative Assembly.

On 7 December 2017, R. N. Chamling established the new party, Sikkim Rajya Manch Party (SRMP) in Sribadam in West Sikkim. He was elected to the President of SRMP, and declared to fight with SDF.

In March 2019, SRMP participated in the electoral alliance, Sikkim Progressive Alliance (SPA) which was formed by Sikkim Sangram Parishad (SSP), Sikkim National People’s Party (SNPP) and Sikkim United Front Party (SUFP). SPA sent 8 candidates for 2019 Sikkim Legislative Assembly election, 1 candidate for 2019 Sikkim Lok Sabah election, and 3 of 9 are SRMP candidates. But in this election, all SRMP candidates lost and secured only 3.85% (R. N. Chamling from Rangang-Yangang) or less votes in each constituency.

SRMP didn't participate in the Bye-Election of Sikkim Legislative Assembly on 21 October 2019.

Electoral records 
 Sikkim Legislative Assembly election

References

Political parties in Sikkim
Political parties established in 2017
2017 establishments in Sikkim